Ali, the Fighter is a 1975 American biographical film directed by Rick Baxter and William Greaves. The film starring Muhammad Ali, George Foreman, Joe Frazier and Burt Lancaster in the lead roles.

Cast
 Muhammad Ali
 George Foreman
 Joe Frazier
 Burt Lancaster as Narrator

References

External links
 

1970s biographical films
American biographical films
1975 films
1970s English-language films
1970s American films